Imbricaria interlirata, common name the interlyrate mitre, is a species of sea snail, a marine gastropod mollusk in the family Mitridae, the miters or miter snails.

Description
The length of the shell varies between 29 mm and 57 mm.

Distribution
This marine species occurs in the Indo-West Pacific and off New Guinea and Fiji.

References

 Poppe G.T. & Tagaro S.P. (2008). Mitridae. pp. 330–417, in: G.T. Poppe (ed.), Philippine marine mollusks, volume 2. Hackenheim: ConchBooks. 848 pp.

External links
 Gastropods.com: Subcancilla interlirata

Mitridae
Gastropods described in 1844